Chinosphere may refer to:
 Cryosphere (earth sciences), an arctic geography terminology
 Sinosphere (linguistics), a term refers to the Mainland Southeast Asia linguistic area